Norby or Nørby is a given name and a surname. Notable people and characters with these names include:

Given name 
Norby Chabert (born 1975), American political consultant 
Norby Williamson, American business executive

Surname 
Cæcilie Norby (born 1964), Danish jazz and rock singer
Chris Norby (born 1949), American politician
Ellen Trane Nørby (born 1980), Danish politician
Erik Norby (1936–2007), Danish composer
Ghita Nørby (born 1935), Danish actress 
Henrik Norby (1889–1964), Norwegian Olympic modern pentathlete
John Norby (1910–1998), American football running back
Kate Norby (born 1976), American actress
Paul R. Norby (1913–2015), rear admiral in the United States Naval Reserve
Peter Nørby (born 1940), Danish chess player
Reginald Norby (1934–2012), Norwegian diplomat
Søren Norby (died 1530), Danish naval officer

Fictional characters 

 Norby, a robot created by Janet and Isaac Asimov
 Pearson Norby, lead character in the 1955 American TV sitcom Norby

Germanic-language surnames